Simón Bolívar (1783–1830) was the Venezuelan leader of independence movements in several South American countries.

Bolívar or Bolivar may also refer to:

Film and television
Bolívar (TV series), a 2019 Colombian series distributed by Netflix
Bolivar (Disney), Donald Duck's St. Bernard dog in the Disney cartoons
Bolívar, theatrical drama of Jules Supervielle
Bolívar, mini-series for television written and directed in 1983 by Betty Kaplan

Places
The Bolivarian countries, Bolivia, Colombia, Ecuador, Panama, Peru, and Venezuela

Argentina
Bolívar Partido, an administrative division of Buenos Aires Province

Australia
Bolivar, South Australia

Bolivia
Bolívar, Cochabamba
Bolívar Province, Bolivia

Colombia
Bolívar Department
Bolívar, Cauca, a town and municipality
Bolívar, Santander, a town and municipality
Bolívar, Valle del Cauca, a town and municipality

Costa Rica
Bolívar District, Grecia, a district in the Grecia Canton of Alajuela Province

Ecuador
Bolívar Province (Ecuador)
Bolívar Canton, Carchi, a canton
Bolívar Canton, Manabí, a canton

Peru
Bolívar, Peru, the capital city of Bolívar District
Bolívar District, Bolívar, a district
Bolívar Province, Peru, a province in La Libertad Region

Spain
Cenarruza-Puebla de Bolívar

United States
Bolivar, Alabama
Bolivar, Georgia
Bolivar Township, Benton County, Indiana
Bolivar, Indiana
Bolivar, Louisiana
Bolivar County, Mississippi
Bolivar, Missouri
Bolivar (town), New York
Bolivar (village), New York
Bolivar, Ohio
Bolivar, Pennsylvania
Bolivar, Tennessee
Bolivar, Texas
Bolivar Peninsula, Texas
Bolivar Lighthouse, Texas
Bolivar Roads (Texas)
Port Bolivar, Texas
Bolivar, West Virginia

Uruguay
Bolívar, Montevideo, a barrio
Bolívar, Uruguay, a village in Canelones Department

Venezuela
Bolívar (state)
Ciudad Bolívar (Bolivar City), formerly Angostura, capital of the state of Bolívar
Roman Catholic Archdiocese of Ciudad Bolívar
Bolívar, Aragua, a municipality
Bolívar, Barinas, a municipality
Bolívar, Falcón, a municipality
Bolívar Municipality, Monagas, a municipality
Bolívar Municipality, Sucre, a municipality
Bolívar, Táchira, a municipality
Bolívar, Yaracuy, a municipality

Sports
Bolívar (footballer, born 1954), Bolívar Modualdo Guedes, Brazilian football midfielder
Bolívar (footballer, born 1980), Fabian Guedes, Brazilian football manager and former centre-back
Club Bolívar, an association football club based in Bolivia
Club Ciudad de Bolívar, an Argentine volleyball club from the homonymous city
Seguros Bolívar Open Barranquilla, a tennis tournament held in Colombia and Costa Rica
Copa Simón Bolívar, International South American football tournament played between 1970 and 1976

Other uses
Bolívar (cigar brand)
Venezuelan bolívar, the unit of currency of Venezuela
Bolivar Coastal Field, an oilfield in Maracaibo Lake
Bolívar Park (Medellín, Colombia)
Hotel Bolívar, a historic hotel of Lima (Peru)
Pico Bolívar, a mountain in the Venezuelan Andes
Puerto Bolívar Airport, an airport in Colombia
Puerto Bolívar, a port of Ecuador
Teatro Bolívar, a theatre in Quito, Ecuador
Bolivar (Paris Métro), a station on Paris Métro Line 7bis
Bolívar Station (Buenos Aires Metro)
USS Bolivar, Bayfield-class attack transport in the United States
Bolivar (wasp), a genus of parasitic wasp in subfamily Doryctinae
Bolívar, opera by Darius Milhaud
Puerto Bolívar, a port in Cerrejón mine (Colombia)
Bolívar, a superunit of the first Bolivian boliviano

People with the surname
Francisco Bolívar Zapata (born 1948), Mexican bioscientist
Ignacio Bolívar (1850–1944), Spanish entomologist
María Bolívar (born 1975), Venezuelan politician
Marta Larraechea Bolívar (born 1944), Chilean politician, First Lady of Chile (1994–2000)
Nastassja Bolívar (born 1988), Nicaraguan American beauty queen
Simon Bolivar Buckner (1823–1914),  American military officer and politician
Simon Bolivar Buckner Jr. (1886–1945), American military officer

People with the given name
Bolívar Gómez (born 1977), Ecuadorian football (soccer) player

See also
Simón Bolívar (disambiguation)
Plaza Bolivar (disambiguation)

Basque-language surnames